Chinnamma Chilikamma (CP) Thirunavukkarasu is an Indian politician from Puducherry.

A member of the Dravida Munnetra Kazhagam (DMK) party, he was elected to the Rajya Sabha, the Upper House of the Indian Parliament, for the 1997–2003 term.

References

Rajya Sabha members from Puducherry
Puducherry politicians
Dravida Munnetra Kazhagam politicians
Year of birth missing
Possibly living people